President George W. Bush and Prime Minister Thaksin Shinawatra announced the intention to negotiate a US-Thailand free trade agreement on October 19, 2003, during President Bush's state visit to Thailand on the event of the APEC Leaders' meeting in Bangkok. Mr. Thaksin was deposed in the 2006 Thai coup d'état without having finished negotiating the agreement.

See also 
 Siamese-American Treaty of Amity and Commerce of 1833, proclaimed June 24, 1837, a free-trade agreement except for munitions of war and opium, or to export rice, but without reciprocity
 Reciprocity (international relations)
Rules of Origin
Market access
Free-trade area
Tariffs

External links
The US-Thailand Free Trade Agreement (FTA) Business Coalition 
The White House Fact Sheet on Free Trade and Thailand 
FTA Watch - Site critical of Free Trade Agreements

Foreign trade of Thailand
Thailand–United States relations
Thailand
Treaties of Thailand
Proposed free trade agreements